Roger Kenneth Evans (born 18 March 1947) is a British politician and barrister who served as the Member of Parliament (MP) for Monmouth from 1992 to 1997. He is a member of the Conservative Party.

Career
Evans was born in 1947, the son of G. R. and Dr. A. M. Evans, and was educated at Bristol Grammar School and Trinity Hall, Cambridge. During his time at university he was a chairman of the Cambridge University Conservative Association, and was elected President of the Cambridge Union during Lent term, 1970. 

Evans first stood for Parliament, unsuccessfully, at Warley West in October 1974 and again in 1979, but he was beaten by Labour's Peter Archer each time.

Evans contested Ynys Môn in the 1987 election. It was a Conservative seat with a majority of 1,684 votes from the 1983 election, but the Conservatives lost the seat to Plaid Cymru.

Evans was elected the Member of Parliament for Monmouth in 1992, winning the seat back from Labour's Huw Edwards who had defeated Evans in by-election the previous year. However, at the 1997 general election, Edwards retook the seat. Evans stood again in 2001 when he lost by 384 votes.

Evans, a barrister, was a junior Social Security minister from 1994 to 1997.

He was a guest on episode S0041 of the American public affairs show Firing Line, alongside Irish Socialist Bernadette Devlin, recorded on 25 March 1972.

See also
 1991 Monmouth by-election

References

Sources
 Times Guide to the House of Commons, Times Newspapers Limited, 1997 edition.

External links
 

1947 births
Living people
Conservative Party (UK) MPs for Welsh constituencies
UK MPs 1992–1997
Monmouth, Wales
Presidents of the Cambridge Union
Alumni of Trinity Hall, Cambridge